Aurora Perrineau is an American actress and model. She is best known for starring as Shana Elmsford in Jem and the Holograms (2015), the live-action film adaptation of the 1980s animated television series Jem and her role as Detective Dani Powell in Fox's Prodigal Son.

Early life 
Perrineau was born to model Brittany Perrineau and actor Harold Perrineau.

Career 
Perrineau is a model signed to Click Model Management, Inc.

In 2012, Perrineau starred in the direct-to-video film Air Collision. In 2014, Perrineau appeared in episodes of Newsreaders and in Chasing Life as Margo. In April 2014, it was announced that  Perrineau was cast in the role of Shana in the film based on the hit 1980s cartoon Jem and the Holograms. The film came under fire for casting Perrineau, a straight-haired, biracial actress for the role of Shana, a character who had a dark complexion and afro-textured hair. The film was released on October 23, 2015, and was a box office flop, making only $1.4 million in its opening weekend.

In July 2014, Perrineau was cast in Drake Doremus's film Equals. The film had its world premiere at the Toronto International Film Festival on September 5, 2015. Perrineau had a small role in the film Passengers, released on December 21, 2016.

In 2018, Perrineau was cast as Giselle Hammond in the Blumhouse supernatural thriller film Truth or Dare.

Personal life

Sexual assault allegation
In November 2017, Perrineau filed a police report with the Los Angeles County Sheriff's Department accusing scriptwriter Murray Miller of sexual assault in 2012 when the actress was seventeen. Girls actress Lena Dunham initially defended Miller, who was a writer for the series, but later retracted her statements. On August 10, 2018, the Los Angeles County District Attorney’s Office declined to file charges against Miller.

Filmography

Film

Television

Music videos

References

External links 
 
 
 
 

Living people
21st-century American actresses
African-American actresses
American film actresses
Place of birth missing (living people)
American television actresses
21st-century African-American women
21st-century African-American people
Year of birth missing (living people)